The Ministry of Environment is a government ministry of Cambodia charged with environmental protection.

The current minister is Say Sam Al, succeeding Keat Chhon in 2013.

Ministers

See also
Government of Cambodia
Environment of Cambodia

References

External links
 Ministry of Environment 

Environment
Environment of Cambodia
Law of Cambodia
Phnom Penh
Cambodia
Cambodia
Ministries established in 1993
1993 establishments in Cambodia